HMS Mary was a 60-gun fourth rate ship of the line of the Royal Navy, built at Chatham Dockyard and launched on 12 May 1704.

In 1724, Mary fought in battle against the Spanish Catalán.

Orders were issued on 15 December 1736 for Mary to be taken to pieces and rebuilt according to the 1733 proposals of the 1719 Establishment at Portsmouth, from where she was relaunched on 5 October 1742, and renamed HMS Princess Mary.

Princess Mary served until 1766, when she was sold out of the navy.

Notes

References

Lavery, Brian (2003) The Ship of the Line - Volume 1: The development of the battlefleet 1650-1850. Conway Maritime Press. .

Ships of the line of the Royal Navy
1700s ships